Kapamilya, Mas Winner Ka! (formerly Kapamilya Winner Ka!) was a Saturday morning game show produced by ABS-CBN Regional and aired in the Visayas (through TV-3 Cebu and TV-4 Bacolod) and Mindanao (through TV-4 Davao) using Cebuano and Hiligaynon, as well as nationwide on ABS-CBN Regional Channel. In this show, the monthly winner have a chance to win plus studio tour and a chance to watch the variety show It's Showtime live. It replaced the now-defunct variety shows in Bacolod, Cebu and Davao on October 27, 2007. After almost 11 years, the game show concluded on June 30, 2018, in both Bacolod, Cebu and Davao as a cost-cutting measure to digitize all ABS-CBN Regional stations.

Hosts
For Bacolod Production - PBB Season 2 Housemate Nel Rapiz, Dot-dot Pahilanga and Rexy Cabaltera.
For Cebu Production - Roy Empleo, Christine Fernandez (Optometrist), Mia Zeeba M. Ali Faridoon (Miss Cebu 2011), Nicole Tuazon (Miss Mandaue 2012), Joseph Teves (Nurse, Kboyz member), Fidel Cascabel (Medical Technologist, Kboyz member) and Daryll Carillo (Financial Advisor, Nurse, Kboyz member).
For Davao Production - Rovic Cuasito (Dentist by profession and former KSP Host), Redge Ledesma (an HRM Student and former KSP co-Host) and Cherry Maning (Mutya ng Dabaw 2010 2nd Runner Up and former GMA Davao news anchor).

The game
The show begins with its theme song and the game start with a certain themed dance game. There are 50 players to be selected through computer and 25 of them will be qualified for the next round. One of the players will receive a PhP500 prize inside the hat.

Another round comes with the selection of 5 players through a "bingo-like" pattern. The pattern will be selected by a guest celebrity. If one of the five contestants answered the question wrong, there will be a change of selection of another 5 contestants in another pattern. If all 5 contestants answered correctly, they will proceed to the next round (the Question and Answer round).

On the third round, one of the 5 contestants will answer correctly and select the number. The saidnumber will appear on other players and sometimes the player itself. The contestant with 4 numbers appeared, whether  he/she answered or not, will go to the bonus round. In the event that 2 or more contestants have 4 numbers each, they will go on to "Sudden Death." "Sudden Death" refers to a tie-breaking question. Whoever answers the question first and correctly will go to the bonus round.

Finally, in the bonus round, the player (who already qualified for the monthly challenge round) will be given 2 patterns and the numbers appeared on the computer. The computer will automatically select the winning pattern. If the player guessed the 5 numbers correctly according to the computer-selected pattern, he/she will receive PhP3,000 cash.

The Monthly Qualifying Round

Prior to the game, the players must have a qualifying rounds. Once is complete, will get exactly a prize money.

Simulcasting areas

Iloilo
Kalibo
Roxas
Dumaguete
Tacloban

Cagayan de Oro
Iligan
Butuan
General Santos
Koronadal
Cotabato
Dipolog
Pagadian
Zamboanga

In the Visayas and Mindanao, Kapamilya, Mas Winner Ka! broadcasts in selected areas carried over Bacolod, Cebu and Davao.

See also
1 vs. 100
ABS-CBN Regional Network Group
It's Showtime
Game Ka Na Ba?
Sabado Barkada (2003-2007; ABS-CBN Bacolod)
Sabado Na Gyud (later retitled as Sabado na, Game pa! (1995-2005, 2005-2007; ABS-CBN Cebu)
KSP:Kapamilya Sabado Party (2005-2007; ABS-CBN Davao)
SBD Jam (1996-2005; ABS-CBN Davao)
Zambo Jambo (1997-2005; ABS-CBN Zamboanga)
Tsada! (1998-2005; ABS-CBN Cagayan De Oro)
Wowowee
Pilipinas Win Na Win
Happy Yipee Yehey!

References

External links
  ABS-CBN official site

ABS-CBN Regional shows
Philippine game shows
2007 Philippine television series debuts
2018 Philippine television series endings